Karmazinai is a village in Vilnius district municipality, Lithuania. It is situated on the right bank of Neris River, by forest, part of the Neris Regional Park. There is an ancient burial mound and hill fort (Karmazinai mound) about 0.8 km northwest of the village.

Vilnius District Municipality
Villages in Vilnius County